Uda-Clocociov is a commune in Teleorman County, Muntenia, Romania. It is composed of two villages, Uda-Clocociov and Uda-Paciurea. These were part of Slobozia Mândra Commune until 2004, when they were split off.

References

Communes in Teleorman County
Localities in Muntenia